Gustav Dam (16 April 1908 – 23 April 1946) was a South African cricketer. He played in two first-class matches for Border in 1931/32.

See also
 List of Border representative cricketers

References

External links
 

1908 births
1946 deaths
South African cricketers
Border cricketers
Cricketers from Port Elizabeth